The Morse River is a river of the West Coast Region of New Zealand's South Island. It flows generally northwest from its source in the Strachan Range, reaching the Mahitahi River 14 kilometres south of Bruce Bay.

See also
List of rivers of New Zealand

References

Rivers of the West Coast, New Zealand
Rivers of New Zealand
Westland District